Manasa is one of the 230 Vidhan Sabha (Legislative Assembly) constituencies of Madhya Pradesh state in central India. This constituency came into existence in 1951 as one of the 79 Vidhan Sabha constituencies of the erstwhile Madhya Bharat state.

Overview
Manasa (constituency number 228) is one of the 3 Vidhan Sabha constituencies located in Neemuch district. This constituency covers the entire Manasa tehsil of the district.

Manasa is part of Mandsour Lok Sabha constituency along with seven other Vidhan Sabha segments, namely, Neemuch and Jawad in this district, Jaora in Ratlam district and Mandsour, Malhargarh, Suwasra and Garoth in Mandsaur district.

Members of Vidhan Sabha
As a constituency of Madhya Bharat state:
 1951: Ram Lal, Indian National Congress
As a constituency of Madhya Pradesh state:
 1957: Sunder Lal Patwa, Bharatiya Jana Sangh
 1962: Sundarlal Patwa, Bharatiya Jana Sangh
 1967: Nandram Das (Balkavi Bairagi), Indian National Congress (defeated Jana Sangh's Patwa) 
 1972: Surajbhai Tugnawat, Indian National Congress  (defeated Jana Sangh's Patwa)
 1977: Ramchandra Basar, Janata Party
 1980: Nand Ram Das (Bal Kavi Bairagi), Indian National Congress (I)
 1985: Narendra Bhanwarlal Nahta, Indian National Congress. Defeated Sunder Lal Patwa. 
 1990: Radhe Shyam Ladha, Bharatiya Janata Party
 1993: Narendra Bhanwarlal Nahta, Indian National Congress
 1998: Narendra Bhanwarlal Nahta (Congress), defeated Mangal Patwa of BJP 
 2003: Kailash Chawla, Bharatiya Janata Party
 2008: Vijendra Singh Malaheda, Indian National Congress
 2013: Kailash Chawla, Bharatiya Janata Party
 2018: Anirudh Maroo, BJP

Election results

1957 Vidhan Sabha
 Sunderlal (BJS) : 12,437 votes 
 Ramlal (INC) : 9,733

2003 Vidhan Sabha
 Kailash Chawala (BJP) : 67,193 votes 
 Narendra Nahata (INC) : 41,836

2008 Vidhan Sabha
 Vijendrasingh Malaheda (Vijju Banna) (INC) : 38,632 votes 
 Aniruddha Rameshawar (Madhav Maru) (BJSH / Probably BJP Rebel or ally) : 33,197

2018 Vidhan Sabha
 ANIRUDHA (MADHAV) MAROO (Bharatiya Janata Party) : 87,004 votes 
 UMRAO SINGH SHIVLAL (Congress) : 61,050

References

Neemuch district
Assembly constituencies of Madhya Pradesh